Doell is a surname. Notable people with the surname include:

Karen Doell (born 1965), Canadian softball player
Kevin Doell (born 1979), Canadian ice hockey player
Paul Doell, American labor leader
Richard Doell (1923–2008), American geophysicist

See also
Roell